The 2011 Capital One Canada Cup of Curling was held from November 30 to December 4 at the Cranbrook Recreational Complex in Cranbrook, British Columbia. The format for this year's competition was changed from the previous year. Instead of 10 men's and 10 women's teams in two pools of five each, there were seven teams of each gender competing in a round robin. The first place teams advanced to their respective finals, while the second and third place teams met in the semifinals. Capital One became the sponsor of the Canada Cup of Curling after a deal with the Canadian Curling Association to become the sponsor of the Canada Cup and the Pre-Trials Road to the Roar.

In the women's final, Jennifer Jones picked up her second Canada Cup after winning a one-sided affair against fellow Manitoban Chelsea Carey, winning in eight ends with a score of 9–4. In the men's final, Kevin Martin won his record fourth Canada Cup as skip and avenged a loss to Glenn Howard at last year's Cup, winning with a score of 7–4.

The winners, Kevin Martin and Jennifer Jones, became the first teams to qualify for the 2013 Canadian Olympic Curling Trials in Winnipeg, Manitoba, which will determine Canada's representatives for the 2014 Winter Olympic Games in Sochi, Russia. The total prize money was CAD$70,000 each for the men's and women's events, and the winning teams each received CAD$26,000. In addition to berths into the 2013 Trials, the winners also received invitations to the 2012 Canada Cup of Curling in Moose Jaw, Saskatchewan and the 2013 Continental Cup of Curling at Penticton, British Columbia.

Team entries

Women
Defending champion: Stefanie Lawton
2011 Scotties Tournament of Hearts champion: Amber Holland
2010-11 CTRS team: Jennifer Jones
2010-11 CTRS team: Shannon Kleibrink
2010-11 CTRS team: Heather Nedohin
2010-11 CTRS team: Chelsea Carey
2010-11 CTRS team: Rachel Homan

Men
Defending champion: Glenn Howard
2011 Tim Hortons Brier champion: Jeff Stoughton
2010-11 CTRS team: Kevin Martin
2010-11 CTRS team: Mike McEwen
2010-11 CTRS team: Kevin Koe
2010-11 CTRS team: Steve Laycock
2010-11 CTRS team: Brad Jacobs

Men

Teams

Round-robin standings

Round-robin results

Draw 1
Wednesday, November 30, 9:00 am

Draw 2
Wednesday, November 30, 2:00 pm

Draw 3
Wednesday, November 30, 7:00 pm

Draw 4
Thursday, December 1, 9:00 am

Draw 5
Thursday, December 1, 2:00 pm

Draw 6
Thursday, December 1, 7:00 pm

Draw 7
Friday, December 2, 9:00 am

Draw 8
Friday, December 2, 2:00 pm

Draw 9
Friday, December 2, 7:00 pm

Playoffs

Semifinal
Saturday, December 3, 6:00 pm

Final
Sunday, December 4, 1:30 pm

Women

Teams

* Darbyshire filled in for Chelsey Matson

Round-robin standings

Round-robin results

Draw 1
Wednesday, November 30, 9:00 am

Draw 2
Wednesday, November 30, 2:00 pm

Draw 3
Wednesday, November 30, 7:00 pm

Draw 4
Thursday, December 1, 9:00 am

Draw 5
Thursday, December 1, 2:00 pm

Draw 6
Thursday, December 1, 7:00 pm

Draw 7
Friday, December 2, 9:00 am

Draw 8
Friday, December 2, 2:00 pm

Draw 9
Friday, December 2, 7:00 pm

Playoffs

Semifinal
Saturday, December 3, 1:00 pm

Final
Sunday, December 4, 9:00 am

References

External links
Home Page

Canada Cup of Curling, 2011
Cup of Curling
Canada Cup (curling)
Cranbrook, British Columbia
2011 in British Columbia
November 2011 sports events in Canada
December 2011 sports events in Canada